Khelo India University Games (KIUG), is a national level multi-sport event held in India, where athletes from universities across the country compete in different sports disciplines. The inaugural edition held in Odisha started on 22 February and concluded on 1 March 2020. It is organised by Sports Authority of India (SAI) and Ministry of Youth Affairs and Sports along with Association of Indian Universities, Indian Olympic Association and National Sports Federation. It is the largest university level sports competition in India.

Khelo India University Games was launched after the success of the Khelo India Youth Games, which had completed its third edition in 2020. The Khelo India University Games is intended to identify and train capable athletes in the age group of 18 to 25 years for the Olympics and the Asian Games.

History 
On 22 February 2020, Prime Minister Narendra Modi, inaugurated the first edition of the Khelo India University Games in Cuttack. The inaugural event was held at JNL Indoor Stadium. Coaches and officials believe that the event gives athletes the exposure of multi-disciplinary events and promote sporting talent at the university level.

Editions

2020 edition 
The 2020 edition was held from 22 February to 1 March 2020 includes 211 events in 17 sports. The sport events were held at Kalinga Institute of Industrial Technology (KIIT) in Bhubaneswar, JNL Indoor Stadium, SAI-Odisha Badminton Academy and SAI International Residential School in Cuttack.

More than 4000 athletes from 176 universities participated in the events. The number of medals include 206 Gold, 206 Silver and 286 Bronze. Fencing and Rugby were included for the first time in a Khelo India competition.

Panjab University finished first with 46 total medals that included 17 gold, 19 silver and 10 bronze medals. Savitribai Phule Pune University and Punjabi University were second and third with 37 and 33 total medals respectively. National record-holding sprinter, Dutee Chand participated representing KIIT. She won two gold medals in 100m and 200m events. Siddhant Sejwal of Panjab University and Sadhvi Dhuri of Pune University were the top performers with five gold medals each.

Teams 

Source: Khelo India

Medals tally

2022 edition 

The second edition of the Khelo India University games was supposed to be held in the year 2021 but was later postponed to 2022 due to the COVID-19 pandemic in the country. It is to be hosted by Bangalore's Jain University and is expected to be held between April-May 2022. Jain University’s School of Engineering and Technology campus and The Sports School campus situated at Kanakapura Road are hosting majority of the events while some events are being hosted at different campuses of the university.  However the opening ceremony is to be held in Sree Kanteerava Stadium in Bangalore while the closing ceremony is to held in the global campus of Jain University.

More than 5000 athletes from over 170 institutes are expected to take part in the games making it the biggest ever Khelo Games till date.

Teams 

Rest of the participants are yet to be announced

Medal table

Sport events

Gallery

See also 
 National Games of India
 Khelo India Youth Games
 Khelo India Winter Games

References

External links 

Multi-sport events in India
Sport in India
2020 establishments in Odisha
National multi-sport events
Khelo India